Nara Chandrababu Naidu (born 20 April 1950) is an Indian politician and current leader of opposition of the Andhra Pradesh Legislative Assembly. He was also the leader of the opposition of the Andhra Pradesh Legislative Assembly from 2004 to 2014. He is also the former Chief Minister of United Andhra Pradesh serving from 1995 to 2004  and Chief Minister of Andhra from 2014 to 2019. He is the longest Served Chief Minister of United Andhra Pradesh (9 Years).

He is the National President of the Telugu Desam Party (TDP). He also served as the convenor of National Democratic Alliance (NDA). He suffered a major political setback in the 2019 Andhra Pradesh Legislative Assembly Elections by winning only 23 seats out of the 175 assembly segments.

Early life and education 
Naidu was born on 20 April 1950 at Naravaripalle, Tirupati district in present-day Andhra Pradesh in an agricultural family to Nara Kharjura Naidu and his wife Amanamma. He has a younger brother Nara Ramamurthy Naidu and two younger sisters. Naidu has vitiligo, an autoimmune disease which causes white patches on the skin.

Since his village had no school, Naidu attended primary school in Seshapuram up to class five and the Chandragiri Government High School up to class 10. He completed his B.A. degree in 1972 from Sri Venkateshwara Arts College, Tirupati. He did his master's degree in Economics from Sri Venkateswara University. In 1974, under the guidance of professor Dr. D. L. Narayana he started work on his Ph.D.  on the topic of Economic ideas of Professor N. G. Ranga,  but did not complete his Ph.D.

Political Career

Indian National Congress 
Naidu started his political activities as a students' union leader in Sri Venkateswara University while pursuing his master's degree. In 1975, he joined Indian Youth Congress and became the president for its local chapter in Pulicherla. After the emergency was imposed on the country in 1975, he became a close supporter of Sanjay Gandhi.

With the help of N. G. Ranga, Naidu secured a candidacy from the Congress party, under its 20% quota for the youth, and became a member of the Legislative Assembly (MLA) for the Chandragiri constituency in 1978 at the age of 28. He served as a director of Andhra Pradesh Small Scale Industries Development Corporation. Later, he was appointed as the minister for cinematography in T. Anjaiah's government. He became the youngest MLA and the youngest minister, at the age of 28, in Andhra Pradesh at that time. After becoming a minister, he dropped his PhD program.

In 1979, he played a crucial role in electing G. Kuthuhalamma as Chittoor Zilla Parishad chief, against the official Congress candidate. Following this, he was suspended from the party for two months.

As the cinematography minister, Naidu came in contact with N. T. Rama Rao, a popular film star in Telugu cinema. In 1980, he married Bhuvaneswari, Rao's second daughter.

Telugu Desam Party 

In 1982, N. T. Rama Rao formed the Telugu Desam Party (TDP) and swept the assembly polls held in 1983. Chandrababu Naidu who was his son-in-law was still in the Congress Party and he even dared contesting against his father-in-law, NTR and Telugu Desam Party. But Naidu lost in the elections as an MLA from Chandragiri Assembly Constituency. Having no choice, he immediately left the Congress Party and joined Telugu Desam Party. He became the Finance and Revenue Minister in N. T. Rama Rao's ministry.

Legislative career (1989–1995) 
In the 1989 assembly election, Naidu contested from Kuppam constituency as a TDP candidate and won by 5,000 votes. INC, however, had regained power in the election so Naidu had to sit in the opposition. Rama Rao appointed him as a coordinator of the TDP, in which capacity he handled the party's role of the main opposition in the assembly which won him wide appreciation from both the party and the public. His role during this phase, both inside the Legislative Assembly and outside, was a critical factor for the subsequent success of the party.

Naidu won the 1994 elections from Kuppam constituency. He became the Finance and Revenue Minister in N. T. Rama Rao's ministry.

First term as Chief Minister of Andhra Pradesh (1995–1999) 

On 1 September 1995, Naidu came to power as the Chief Minister by organising a coup against Rama Rao. In an interview with Reuters, Rama Rao compared himself to Shah Jahan, a 17th-century Mughal emperor who was imprisoned by his son, and predicted that he would gain his revenge against what he called "the backstabbers" in his family, especially his son-in-law and successor, Naidu.

Second term as Chief Minister of Andhra Pradesh(1999–2004) 

TDP, led by Naidu, won a majority in the state legislature, with 185 of 294 seats in the Assembly and 29 of 42 seats in the Parliament in the 1999 general election, making it the second-largest party in the BJP-led NDA coalition government.

Assassination attempt 
On 1 October 2003, Naidu survived a land mine blast by People's War Group (PWG) near Alipiri tollgate, within the vicinity of Alipiri police station. A total of 17 claymore mines were planted, of which 9 exploded.

2004 and 2009 elections 
Farmers and majortiy sections of people got fed up with Chandrababu Naidu for mainly concentrated  on IT policies and not on agriculture. Chandrababu Naidu after the assassination attempt on him, dissolved the assembly and went for early elections but he suffered a major backlash and lost as Chief Minister as he did not consider Y.S.R padayatra seriously. He won only 47 seats out of the total 294 assembly segments and 5 of 42 in the Lok Sabha. This was a humiliating and never before seen defeat then for him and also Telugu Desam Party.

Chandrababu Naidu who lost in 2004 Assembly elections got the same result again in 2009 Assembly elections. He outlooked Chiranjeevi who formed new party Praja Rajyam Party  in hopes to create past  glory as Telugu Desam Party which results in splitting of votes. He formed a grand alliance with TRS Party, which pitched for the separate state of Telangana and also with CPI and CPM. He and his party got 28% votes where as Congress got 34%. Chiranjeevi who got 18% joined congress without regret. Then Y. S. Rajasekhara Reddy became the Chief Minister of the state again for the second time in 2009.

Chief Minister of Andhra Pradesh (2014-2019) 
After the  bifurcation of the Andhra Pradesh, Naidu and formed an alliance again with the Bharatiya Janata Party and Jana Sena Party and returned to power in Andhra Pradesh state, winning 102 seats out of 175 seats. The inclusion of Bharatiya Janata Party in the alliance made people believe that the state may get developed due to the central government's support. This made TDP win an outright majority. Naidu took oath as the first Chief Minister of the residuary state of Andhra Pradesh at Mangalagiri on the grounds of Acharya Nagarjuna University near Guntur. Naidu has won a number of awards, including IT Indian of the Millennium from India Today, Business Person of the Year by The Economic Times, South Asian of the Year from Time Asia, Golden Peacock Award for leadership in Public Service & Economic Transformation, and membership in the World Economic Forum's Dream Cabinet. Naidu chaired the National IT Panel under the National Democratic Alliance (India) (NDA) government and was described as one of the "hidden seven" working wonders of the world by Profit (Oracle Corporation's monthly magazine). Naidu was offered an honorary professorship by US business school, the Kellogg School of Management in 2000. He was the Chairman of National Task Force on Micro-irrigation from Government of India, Ministry of Agriculture in 2003. He was the head of 13-member Committee of Chief Ministers to promote digital payment systems and financial inclusion in India which was constituted by federal government in 2016.

2015 Cash for Vote Scam 

The 2015 cash-for-votes scam was a political scandal, the second scandal of its kind since the 2008 cash-for-votes scandal. It started off when the TDP leaders of Telangana state were caught in video footage, aired in the media, offering bribes to a nominated MLA, Elvis Stephenson, for his vote in the 2015 elections of the Telangana Legislative Council. The TDP MLA Revanth Reddy was arrested by the Telangana Police when he was offering  to Stephenson. Reddy was then presented before the court and was sent to jail. Similarly, the phone conversation, which was quoted as the voice of Naidu with Stephenson was aired in the news media.

In August 2016, Alla Ramakrishna Reddy filed a petition with a report from a forensic laboratory which confirmed the voice of Naidu in the tape to be genuine. The Anti-Corruption Bureau (ACB) court order the Telangana division of the ACB to investigate on the report. Naidu was not included in the preliminary charge sheet filed by the Enforcement Directorate in May 2021 in connection with the case.

Special status dispute and break with BJP 

In 2018 Naidu quit from the National Democratic Alliance as special status to Andhra Pradesh after bifurcation was not yet fulfilled  by the BJP.  Until 2018 after the denial of special status to Andhra Pradesh, Naidu accepted for special category as a compensatory.

Opposition alleged that TDP was supressing the agitations and movements for the demand of special status across the state. TDP bagged criticism for not advocating support to the agitations when it was still in the NDA.  

He staged a Dharma Porata Deeksha accusing BJP and Narendra Modi of not granting Special Status to Andhra Pradesh as promised. As part of protest TDP took the movement to Delhi and staged a hunger-strike protest. BJP who was at default of granting the special status to Andhra Pradesh criticized Naidu as a U-turn politician.

Alliance with the Congress Party 
Chandrababu Naidu after coming out of alliance with BJP formed an alliance with Telugu Desam Party's rival Congress Party. This didn't go well with people and many political observers. Congress Party is regarded as the rival party of TDP for many years. It is also the party which bifurcated the state hastily. Forming an alliance with such Party completely damaged the image of TDP.

Leader of the opposition (2019–present) 
Led by Naidu, TDP lost the 2019 Andhra Pradesh Legislative Assembly election to the YSR Congress Party led by Y. S. Jagan Mohan Reddy. It was the party's biggest defeat since its inception in 1982; TDP won 23 assembly seats out of 175 and 3 Lok Sabha seats out of 25.

Business career 
The Heritage Group (HFL) was incorporated by Naidu in 1992. In 1994, HFL went for public issue to raise resources. Currently, the organisation is being led by Nara Brahmani, Naidu's daughter-in-law. Heritage has hundreds of outlets throughout Andhra Pradesh and Telangana and a significant presence in Karnataka, Kerala, Tamil Nadu, Maharashtra, Odisha, NCR-Delhi, Haryana, Rajasthan, Punjab, Uttar Pradesh, Gujarat, Uttarakhand, and Himachal Pradesh which comprises a solid portion of Naidu's current assets.

Awards and recognition 
The then Governor of Illinois, Jim Edgar, created a Naidu day on 24 September 1998 in his honour.
 Voted IT Indian of the Millennium in a poll by India Today and 20:20 Media.
He was named South Asian of the Year in 1999 by Time magazine, USA
In 2001, he was described as one of the hidden "Seven working wonders around the world", by Profit, a monthly magazine published by Oracle Corporation, US.
Business Person of the Year by Economic Times.
Golden Peacock Award for Leadership in Public Service & Economic Transformation - 2017
Global Agriculture Policy Leadership Award by Indian Council of Food and Agriculture (ICFA).
 The Pune-based organisation, Bharatiya Chatra Sansad, in partnership with MIT School of Governance, honoured him with Aadarsh Mukhyamantri Puraskar (Model CM Award) in its 6th annual session on 30 January 2016.
Transformative Chief Minister Award in May 2017 by US-India Business Council (USIBC) at West Coast Summit in the Silicon Valley.

Criticism 
Naidu's son Nara Lokesh was appointed as the minister in his cabinet. This was criticized by the opposition and the critics. His son lost the 2019 Andhra Pradesh election from Mangalagiri Assembly Constituency. TDP lost the 2019 Andhra Pradesh Legislative Assembly election massively to the YSRCP. This was a never before seen defeat in the history of Telugu Desam Party (TDP).

Naidu was also criticized for having political alliances with many political parties. He got into alliance with BJP, Congress Party, TRS, CPI, CPM and Janasena Party. Naidu also has a bad reputation of not winning the elections without an alliance. He also earned a bad name of coming out of the alliances with all the parties he aligned with for his own political reasons.

Notes

References

Bibliography

Further reading

Books 
 India's Glocal Leader, Tejaswini Pagadala
 Manasulo Maata, Sevanthi Nenon, An Autobiography of Chandrababu Naidu
Nirantar Pragathi Ke Path Par Chandrababu Naidu (in Hindi), Dr. Inagati Lavanya

Case studies 
New Modern Economy Management in Andhra Pradesh: A Case Study of Sri Honorable Chief Minister N Chandra Babu Naidu by authors N. Sree Ramulu and Morusu Siva Sankar

External links 

 

1950 births
Living people
People from Chittoor district
Sri Venkateswara University alumni
Telugu politicians
Telugu Desam Party politicians
Indian National Congress politicians from Andhra Pradesh
Chief Ministers of Andhra Pradesh
Chief ministers from Telugu Desam Party
Andhra Pradesh MLAs 1978–1983
Andhra Pradesh MLAs 1989–1994
Andhra Pradesh MLAs 1994–1999
Andhra Pradesh MLAs 1999–2004
Andhra Pradesh MLAs 2004–2009
Andhra Pradesh MLAs 2014–2019
Andhra Pradesh MLAs 2019–2024
People with vitiligo